Mudpit may refer to:

 MudPIT, multi-dimensional protein identification technology
 Mudpit (TV series)